Inor is a commune in the Meuse department in Grand Est in north-eastern France.

Demography

See also
 Communes of the Meuse department

References

Communes of Meuse (department)